was a Japanese artist and surimono artist who flourished between 1799 and 1823. He was a student of Hokusai.

References

External link

Japanese painters
19th-century Japanese artists
Year of birth missing
Year of death missing